Nuestra Belleza San Luis Potosí 2012, was held at the Ex-Convento Agustino of Xilitla, San Luis Potosí on June 23, 2012. At the conclusion of the final night of competition Verónica Sánchez from San Luis Potosí City was crowned the winner. Sánchez was crowned by the Secretary of Tourism Enrique Abud Dip and the Mayor Xilitla Carlos Llamazares. Six contestants competed for the title.

Results

Placements

Contestants

References

External links
Official Website

Nuestra Belleza México